Matthias Hamrol (born 31 December 1993) is a German professional footballer who plays as a goalkeeper for BFC Dynamo.

Career
On 11 June 2019, Hamrol signed for Eredivisie club FC Emmen on a two-year deal with an option for an extra year.

References

External links

1993 births
Living people
German footballers
Association football goalkeepers
Regionalliga players
Oberliga (football) players
Ekstraklasa players
RB Leipzig players
VfL Wolfsburg II players
SSV Reutlingen 05 players
1. FC Köln players
Korona Kielce players
FC Emmen players
SV Wehen Wiesbaden players
ZFC Meuselwitz players
Berliner FC Dynamo players
German expatriate footballers
German expatriate sportspeople in Poland
Expatriate footballers in Poland
People from Troisdorf
Sportspeople from Cologne (region)
Footballers from North Rhine-Westphalia